The athletics competition at the 2018 Central American and Caribbean Games was held in Barranquilla, Colombia from 29 July to 3 August at the Estadio Metropolitano Roberto Meléndez (warm-up Rafael Cotes Stadium).

Medal summary

Men's events

Women's events

Medal table

Participating nations

 (2)
 (2)
 (10)
 (15)
 (2)
 (5)
 (13)
 (4)
 (50)
 (17)
 (52)
 (6)
 (2)
 (26)
 (2)
 (3)
 (22)
 (5)
 (8)
 (2)
 (45)
 (4)
 (40)
 (2)
 (17)
 (20)
 (6)
 (3)
 (2)
 (6)
 (4)
 (28)
 (7)
 (9)
 (27)

References

External links
2018 Central American and Caribbean Games – Athletics

2018
Central American and Caribbean Games
2018 Central American and Caribbean Games events
Central American and Caribbean Games
Qualification tournaments for the 2019 Pan American Games